Iowa Highway 93 is a state highway that runs from east to west through two counties in northeastern Iowa. The eastern terminus of Iowa 93 is at its junction with Iowa Highway 150 in Fayette.

Route description

Iowa Highway 93 begins at U.S. Highway 63 four miles west of Tripoli, entering on 7th Avenue.  At Tripoli, Highway 93 turns north onto Main Street and heads through the heart of town.  North of Tripoli, Iowa 93 travels a  stretch of highway, crossing the Wapsipinicon River before curving to the northeast and then to the east.  Once again heading east, Iowa 93 travels  to Sumner.  East of Sumner, Iowa 93 journeys east through Fayette County for  until it ends at Iowa Highway 150 at Fayette.

History
By 1926, Primary Road No. 93 had been designated between Primary Road No. 59, now U.S. Route 63, and Sumner.  By 1952, Iowa 93 was paved in Fayette County.  The portion in Bremer County was paved in 1955.

Major intersections

References

External links

End of Iowa 93 at Iowa Highway Ends

093